Mount Prometheus is a summit in the U.S. state of Nevada.

Mount Prometheus was named after Prometheus, from Greek mythology. A variant name is "Prometheus Peak".

References

Mountains of Lander County, Nevada